Samuel William Shelton (June 22, 1890 – December 22, 1974) was an American lawyer and politician. After one term in the Virginia House of Delegates, he was appointed by Abram P. Staples as an assistant attorney general of Virginia. He previously served as commonwealth's attorney of Fluvanna County from 1926 to 1934.

References

External links 

1890 births
1974 deaths
Democratic Party members of the Virginia House of Delegates
20th-century American politicians
United States Army personnel of World War I
United States Army soldiers